Scientists and Engineers for America (SEA) was an organization focused on promoting sound science in American government, and supporting candidates who understand science and its applications. SEA was formed on September 27, 2006, and describes itself as non-partisan.

SEA is organized as a 501(c)(3) organization, and represents a reorganization of Scientists and Engineers for Change, an organization founded in 2004 to support the election of John Kerry. Its current executive director is Tom Price.  SEA operates a wiki site called the Science, Health And Related Policies (SHARP) Network, which allows members to track and contribute information on Congressional representatives, candidates, and science policy issues. SEA is associated with a 501(c)(4) organization known as the SEA Action Fund, whose president is geneticist Michael Stebbins.

Political positions

Bill of Rights for Scientists and Engineers
A bill of rights which outlines the principles of the organization states:

Mission statement
The organization's mission statement states:

Programs

SHARP Network
The Science, Health and Related Policies Network is a wiki to track congressional representatives, senators, and candidates as well as presidential candidates.

Innovation & the Elections 2008
Scientists and Engineers for America organized a coalition of 19 science organizations to submit a set of 7 questions to all the candidates for United States Congress. The coalition includes groups such as the American Association for the Advancement of Science, National Academy of Sciences, and Science Debate 2008.

Campaign Education and Training
The Campaign Education and Training project is a workshop aimed at training science-oriented professionals to run for public office.
Along with the workshop, SEA also hosts an online advice column called Campaign Lab for scientists to ask political experts on different aspects of running for political office.

SEA chapters
SEA chapters provide a way for students and members of the scientific community to influence the interface between science and politics. These chapters develop the means for both current and future scientists and engineers to influence the policy arena and expand the forum through which SEA involves scientists and engineers in the political and civic process.

Board of Advisers
Among others, the SEA Board of Advisers includes noted Nobel Laureates such as:

 Peter Agre
 Sidney Altman
 Philip W. Anderson
 Johann Deisenhofer
 Alfred Gilman

 Douglas D. Osheroff
 Martin Perl
 Burton Richter
 Harold E. Varmus

Criticism
Soon after its foundation, the organization was accused of partisanship by several conservative media outlets. An editorial in The Wall Street Journal criticised the organization for seeming to stifle scientific dissent: 

In a rebuttal posted on the SEA website, founding executive director Michael Brown stated:

See also
 Politicization of science
 Scientific Integrity in Policymaking
 Union of Concerned Scientists
 Federation of American Scientists

References

External links
 Science under ‘political assault,’ group says Kansas City Star, September 28, 2006
 Scientists Form Group to Support Science-Friendly Candidates, The New York Times, September 28, 2006
 Science, Health, and Related Policies (SHARP) Network  (inactive)
 Scientists and Engineers for America Action Fund  (inactive)

Organizations established in 2006
Non-profit organizations based in Washington, D.C.
Political advocacy groups in the United States
Politics and technology
Scientific societies based in the United States
Science advocacy organizations